NK Jadran is a Croatian football club based in the city of Poreč. It was founded in 1948 by Croatian handball player Lujo Györy.

History
Jadran began play in the Croatian second division in 1992-93.

Jadran won the 1996-97 3.HNL zapad (west) group.

Jadran participated in the promotion playoffs for the 1.HNL in 1997-98 after winning the zapad (west) group, finishing second in their group and failing to advance. They were relegated to the 3.HNL in 2001 after finishing last and losing the promotion playoff.

Jadran played in the 2013 Croatian cup, losing in the first round to Slaven Belupo.

In 2017 the club, along with the Croatian football association HNS, was involved in a lawsuit for attempting to avoid debts to a former player.

Honours 

 Treća HNL – West:
Winners (1): 2005–06
 Inter-county League Rijeka:
Winners (1): 2015–16

Current squad

References

External links 
NK Jadran Poreč at Nogometni magazin 

Football clubs in Croatia
Football clubs in Istria County
Association football clubs established in 1948
1948 establishments in Croatia